Tiba may refer to:

 Tiba (instrument), a wind instrument used in Switzerland
 Tiba, Burkina Faso
 Tiba language, spoken in Nigeria
 Polar auxin transport inhibitor 2,3,5-triiodobenzoic acid
 Chiba, Chiba, a Japanese city
 Chiba Prefecture, a Japanese prefecture
 TIBÁ, Tecnologia Intuitiva e Bio-Arquitetura (The Bio-Architecture and Intuitive Technology School), an eco-centre located in the coastal jungle of Brazil
 Saipa Tiba, an Iranian car made by Saipa